Calappula saussurei is a species of crab in the family Calappidae, the only species in the genus Calappula.

References

Calappoidea
Monotypic decapod genera